Christopher Rowe may refer to:

 Christopher Rowe (record producer)
 Christopher Rowe (classicist)
 Christopher Rowe (author)